is a former Japanese diver who competed in the 1960 Summer Olympics and in the 1964 Summer Olympics.

References

1940 births
Living people
Japanese male divers
Olympic divers of Japan
Divers at the 1960 Summer Olympics
Divers at the 1964 Summer Olympics
Universiade medalists in diving
Universiade gold medalists for Japan
Medalists at the 1961 Summer Universiade
Medalists at the 1963 Summer Universiade
20th-century Japanese people
21st-century Japanese people